Marriott is an English surname, originally Huguenot and most frequently seen as a surname in East Anglia. Notable people with the surname include:

 Alice Marriott (1824–1900) British actress
 Alice Marriott (historian) (1910–1992), American historian 
 Alice Marriott (1907–2000), American businesswoman, entrepreneur and philanthropist
 Bubba Marriott (born 1938), American football player
 Charles Marriott (1895–1966), English cricketer
 Charles Marriott (rugby union) (1861-1936), English rugby union player and former captain of England, great-uncle of Michael Marriott
 Charles Marriott (Tractarian) (1811–1858), Anglican priest, a fellow of Oriel College, Oxford, and one of the members of the Oxford Movement
 Fred Marriott (1872–1956), American race car driver
 George Marriott (1886-1964), member of the Queensland Legislative Assembly
 Gladys Marriott (1922-2005), American politician
 Hayes Marriott (1873–1929), British colonial administrator
 Henry Marriott (1917-2007), cardiologist and electrocardiogram interpreter
 Jack Marriott (born 1994), English footballer
 Sir James Marriott (judge) (1730–1803), British judge, politician and scholar
 James Marriott (author) (1972–2012), English film critic and writer
 James Henry Marriott (1799–1886), New Zealand theatre manager, actor, writer and bookseller
 Jane Marriott (born 1976), British diplomat
 John Marriott (British politician) (1859–1945), English political economist and historian
 John Charles Oakes Marriott (1895–1978), British Army general
 William Thackeray Marriott (1834–1903), British barrister and politician
 J. Willard Marriott (1900–1985), founder of Marriott Corporation
 J. W. Marriott, Jr., (also known as Bill Marriot) (born 1932), chairman and CEO, Marriott International
 Michael Marriott (1926-1975), head of London Stock Exchange, great-nephew of Charles Marriott (rugby union) and father of Tim Marriott
 Steve Marriott (1947–1991), English rock and roll singer
 Tim Marriott (1958-), English actor
 Tom Marriott, English footballer

English-language surnames